Tomaree is a national park located in New South Wales, Australia,  northeast of Sydney in the Port Stephens local government area. It is located on the shores of the Tasman Sea, extending north from Fishermans Bay to Shoal Bay passing through Boat Harbour, One Mile, Nelson Bay and Fingal Bay.

Most entry points to the park are indicated by signs installed by the New South Wales National Parks and Wildlife Service which usually indicate any activities that may be prohibited within park boundaries. It is a great place for a walk on the beach and whale watching, and you can also come across koalas dozing in the trees.

Two prominent locations in the park are Point Stephens Light, a lighthouse built in 1862 and the Tomaree Head Fortifications, World War II gun emplacements on Tomaree Head which were built in 1941, the location of the No. 20 Radar Station RAAF.

This is the traditional land of the Aboriginal people of Worimi, and provides important resources such as food, medicine and shelter.

See also
 Protected areas of New South Wales

References

National parks of the Hunter Region
Port Stephens Council
Protected areas established in 1984
1984 establishments in Australia